Randall Kent McGilberry (born October 29, 1953) is a former Major League Baseball pitcher who played for two seasons. He pitched in three games for the Kansas City Royals during the 1977 Kansas City Royals season and 18 games during the 1978 Kansas City Royals season. He attended and played baseball for Satsuma High School and played college baseball at Louisiana Tech University.

External links

1953 births
Living people
Baseball players from Alabama
Jacksonville Suns players
Kansas City Royals players
Louisiana Tech Bulldogs baseball players
Major League Baseball pitchers
Omaha Royals players
Sportspeople from Mobile, Alabama
Tiburones de La Guaira players
American expatriate baseball players in Venezuela
Tidewater Tides players